Cape Crossfire is a promontory at the southeastern extremity of the Malta Plateau, marking the point of convergence of the Mariner Glacier from the west and the Borchgrevink Glacier from the north, in Victoria Land. The name alludes to the converging flow of ice at this feature from different directions, and was given by the New Zealand Antarctic Place-Names Committee in 1966.

References
 

Headlands of Victoria Land
Borchgrevink Coast